The 2009–10 season was the Manitoba Junior Hockey League's (MJHL) 93rd season of operation.  

The Dauphin Kings were the best team in both the regular season and playoffs.  The Kings hosted the 2010 Royal Bank Cup in Dauphin and advanced to the national championship game, but lost to the Vernon Vipers.

Season highlights
The Beausejour Blades relocate to Steinbach and are renamed the Steinbach Pistons.
The MJHL showcase event is held Oct 9-11 at the Dakota Community Centre.
Winkler hosts the CJHL Prospects game.
The 2010 Royal Bank Cup is held in Dauphin, where the Dauphin Kings finish second overall.
2010 NHL Entry Draft
Winnipeg South Blues forward Brendan O'Donnell is selected 156th overall by the Tampa Bay Lightning.
Winnipeg South Blues defenceman Peter Stoykewych is selected 199th overall by the Atlanta Thrashers.

Standings

Playoffs

Post MJHL playoffs
Anavet Cup
Dauphin Kings defeat La Ronge Ice Wolves 4-games-to-1
Royal Bank Cup
Dauphin hosts the 2010 Royal Bank Cup.
The Dauphin Kings finish first in the round robin; defeat La Ronge Ice Wolves 6-2 in semi-final; defeated by Vernon Vipers 6-1 in national championship game.

League awards
 Steve "Boomer" Hawrysh Award (MVP): Taylor Dickin, Selkirk
 MJHL Top Goaltender Award: David Aime, OCN
 Brian Kozak Award (Top Defenceman): Seven Shamanksi, Dauphin
 Vince Leah Trophy (Rookie of the Year): Brendan O'Donnell, Winnipeg South
 Lorne Lyndon Memorial Trophy (Hockey Ability and Sportsmanship): Shane Luke, Dauphin
 Muzz McPherson Award (Coach of the Year): Dwayne Kirkup, Swan Valley
 Mike Ridley Trophy (Scoring Champion): Shane Luke, Dauphin
 MJHL Playoff MVP: Joe Caliguiri, Dauphin

CJHL awards
 CJAHL Player of the Year (MJHL): Seven Shamanksi, Dauphin

References

External links
 MJHL Website
 2009-10 MJHL season at HockeyDB.com

Manitoba Junior Hockey League seasons
MJHL